A truss is an architectural structure.

Truss or variant, may also refer to:

Truss (surname), a list of people with the surname
Liz Truss, former prime minister of the United Kingdom
Truss (botany), a terminal cluster of flowers or fruit arising from one stalk
Truss (medicine), a type of surgical appliance
Truss (unit), a bundle of hay or straw
truss (Unix), a Unix operating system program
Trussing needle in cooking, used to tie poultry to hold its shape for roasting
Truss rod, a guitar part used to adjust the profile of its neck
Timber roof truss, a common component of modern wood construction
Truss head screw, a screw with a low and wide profile
Truss's Island, River Thames, England, UK; a riverine island

See also

Truss bridge, a style of bridge architecture
 
 Trus (disambiguation)